"Telephone" is a song by American singer Lady Gaga from her third extended play (EP), The Fame Monster (2009)—the reissue of her debut studio album, The Fame (2008). Featuring American singer Beyoncé, it was released as the EP's second single in January 2010. Written and produced by Gaga and Rodney Jerkins, the song includes additional songwriting contributions from LaShawn Daniels, Lazonate Franklin and Beyoncé. Gaga originally wrote the song for Britney Spears, who recorded a demo. "Telephone" metaphorically represents Gaga's fear of getting suffocated by the media and not having worked hard enough to succeed. Musically, the song consists of an expanded bridge, verse-rap and a sampled voice of an operator announcing that the phone line is unreachable. Beyoncé appears in the middle of the song, singing the verses in a rapid-fire way, accompanied by double beats.

"Telephone" received positive reviews from critics who called it a stand-out track from The Fame Monster and praised Gaga's chemistry with Beyoncé. Several critics included it in their best-of list of 2010. It was nominated for a Grammy Award for Best Pop Collaboration with Vocals, and won a ASCAP Pop Music Award and a BMI Award. Following the album's release, the song charted in many countries, including Australia, Canada, the Netherlands, New Zealand, Sweden and Hungary. Peaking at number three in the US, it was particularly successful in Europe where it topped the charts in Belgium, Denmark, Hungary, Ireland, Norway and the UK. The song sold 7.4 million digital copies worldwide in 2010, making it the year's fourth best-selling single.

Shot as a short film, the accompanying music video is a continuation of the video for "Paparazzi", the fifth single from The Fame. It follows Beyoncé as she bails Gaga out of prison for killing her boyfriend; they go to a diner and poison the customers' breakfast. The video ends as they attempt to escape a high-speed police chase. It references Quentin Tarantino and his films Pulp Fiction (1994) and Kill Bill: Volume 1 (2003). The video received generally positive reviews and was nominated for three awards at the 2010 MTV Video Music Awards, including Video of the Year. In January 2015, Billboard named it the best video of the decade. NME listed it as one of the 100 greatest music videos of all time. Retrospective reviewers analyzed the video's themes, including feminism, lesbianism, and commentary on fame and celebrity culture.

In memory of Alexander McQueen, Gaga performed an acoustic rendition of "Telephone" at the 2010 BRIT Awards. She also sang it during the Super Bowl LI halftime show, and many of her concert tours and other live appearances. The song was covered by several artists and characters from the television show Glee.

Background and release

Lady Gaga originally wrote "Telephone" for singer Britney Spears's sixth studio album, Circus (2008), but Spears rejected it. Later intended to be the guest vocalist, Spears was replaced by Beyoncé. Having previously featured on a remix of Beyoncé's "Video Phone" (2009), "Gaga recorded "Telephone" with her for the extended play (EP) The Fame Monster (2009)—the reissue of Gaga's debut studio album, The Fame (2008). It was released as the EP's second single on January 26, 2010.

The song was mainly inspired by Gaga's fear of "suffocation" as she felt that she seldom found time to have fun. She elaborated that "fear of suffocation—something that I have or fear is never being able to enjoy myself, [...] 'Cause I love my work so much, I find it really hard to go out and have a good time. [...] I don't go to nightclubs, [...] You don't see pictures of me falling out of a club drunk. I don't go—and that's because I usually go and then, you know, a whiskey and a half into it, I got to get back to work."

In May 2011, Gaga said her "emotional connection" with "Telephone" was difficult. When asked if it was because the song was originally written for Spears, she answered: "Well that's not exactly what happened, but I don't want to delve into that. I could delve into it if you turn that (motions to recorder) off[...] But ultimately the mix and the process of getting the production finished was very stressful for me. So when I say it's my worst song it has nothing to do with the song, just my emotional connection to it."

Music and lyrics
Gaga and Rodney Jerkins wrote and produced "Telephone", with additional songwriting by LaShawn Daniels, Lazonate Franklin and Beyoncé. With Matty Green's assistance, the song was mixed at Chalice Recording Studios (Los Angeles, California) by Jerkins and Spike Stent. For the recording, Paul Foley was hired. Gene Grimaldi, Larry Ryckman and Ari Blitz did the song's mastering at Oasis Mastering (Burbank, California), AfterMaster Recording and Mastering Studios (Los Angeles). Mike "Handz" Donaldson recorded Gaga's vocals at Darkchild Studios (Los Angeles), and Hisashi Mizoguchi did Beyoncé's at Studio Groove (Osaka, Japan). Takayuki Matsushima assisted the latter recording. Special effects and additional vocal production were handled by Donaldson.

Musically, "Telephone" has been described as dance-pop. The song starts slowly as Gaga sings in a solemn voice over a harp melody, which changes immediately to a pounding beat. Beyoncé appears in the middle verse in a rapid-fire way, accompanied by double beats. She sings her lyrics through a brief interlude, and later backs the chorus during the rest of the song. "Telephone" consists of an expanded bridge, a verse-rap and an epilogue where a voice announces that the telephone line is unreachable at that moment. According to the sheet music published at Musicnotes.com by Sony/ATV Music Publishing, the song is set in the time signature of common time, with a tempo of 122 beats per minute. Gaga's vocals range from the low note of F3 to the high note of E5. It is set in the key of F Dorian mode, and has a basic sequence of Fm–A–B–Fm as its chord progression.

The lyrics express Gaga's preference for dancing in the club to answering her boyfriend's continuous calls. She further tells him that she "left her head and her heart on the dance floor". According to Gaga, the phone addressed in the lyrics is not just a physical phone but also a person in her head telling her to keep working harder. "That's my fear—that the phone's ringing and my head's ringing, [...] Whether it's a telephone or it's just the thoughts in your head, that's another fear." Using "Telephone" as an example, author Lisa Colton explored the history of telephone songs and their relationship with female empowerment in popular music. She argued that the telephone has been a popular subject in many songs due to its social history and function, which are closely associated with such issues as gender equality. For example, in the past, women's roles were limited to that of operators or low-status employees, and the telephone was a source of controversy as some men worried it gave women more independence and opportunities for romantic engagements. Colton therefore saw "Telephone" as a modern interpretation of the relationship between technology, gender and power.

Critical reception
The song garnered positive reviews from music critics. It was called an album highlight by Nicki Escuerdo from Phoenix New Times, Michael Hubbard from MusicOMH and Evan Sawdey from PopMatters. Hubbard also complimented the song's bridge and ending where the caller gets through to her voicemail. Sawdey wrote that it delivered an adrenaline-fueled experience, helped by the rapid-fire beat and energetic verses. Popjustice wrote: "It's a little bit like Gwen [Stefani]'s 'What You Waiting For?' meets Timbaland's 'The Way I Are' meets about fifty other things [...] The structure's quite exciting". Mikael Woods from Los Angeles Times felt that "Telephone" is a meticulous reflection on the frustrating experience of a guy persistently calling one on their night out in the club.

Gaga's chemistry with Beyoncé was mostly praised. Believing that the track exudes an excitement that suggests potential derailment, Sawdey thought the chemistry between Gaga and Beyoncé elevated the song. According to Adam White of The Independent, "Telephone" showcased the duo at their most fundamental but deliberately so as it was crafted for nightclub frivolity, epitomizing the essence of "trash-pop, a noisy and glitchy slab of energy and dial tones resting entirely on their shared charisma." Billboard Jason Lipshutz named the song Gaga's second best collaboration and called it her "most dynamic duet — and arguably the most compelling pop star team-up of the '00s". Melanie Bertoldi from Billboard stated that the song "sets out to silence bugaboo [...] By the time 'Telephone' surges through a wall of cellular bleeps to return to its simple introduction, Gaga and Beyoncé have left the listener with just one option: surrender to the dancefloor." On the contrary, Sarah Hajibagheri from The Times and Brian Linder of IGN disliked Beyoncé's part; the former believed that her inclusion added to the song's feeling of complete disorder. Armond White from the New York Press also gave a negative review, writing that the song "celebrates a heedless refusal to communicate; to mindlessly, heartlessly indulge pop culture—Tarantino style".

In an early review, Yahoo!'s Chris Willman compared "Telephone" with the duo's other collaborative song, "Video Phone", and wrote: "Maybe it's because the lack of a video for Gaga's 'Telephone' leaves more to the imagination, but if this were a contest, I'd have to say her tune trumps Beyonce's. It's not just that Jerkins has come up with such a feisty track, but that Gaga has the [atti]tude to go with it." 

Several media outlets ranked "Telephone" as one of Gaga's best songs. Calling it "a shuttering electro-pop banger", Billboard acknowledged the song as "an ass-kicking piece of empowerment pop during Gaga’s most prolonged win streak". Vulture similarly recognized the song's feminist message in that Gaga "does things her way, with no regard for the male gaze or the music industry's gatekeepers". The magazine further wrote that the song "didn't just elevate Gaga as a pop star — it made her a new American icon".

Chart performance
In November 2009, the song charted in Ireland, Australia and the UK, debuting at number 26, 29 and 30, respectively. In the US, the song peaked at number three on the Billboard Hot 100 and number one on the Hot Dance Club Songs and the Billboard Pop Songs chart, becoming Gaga's sixth consecutive chart-topper on the lattermost. It also became Beyoncé's sixth number-one on Pop Songs. With this, Gaga and Beyoncé tied with Mariah Carey for most number-ones since the Nielsen BDS-based Top 40 airplay chart launched in 1992. As of early February2019, "Telephone" has sold 3.5 million digital downloads in the US.

In the UK, "Telephone" reached number 12 on the UK Singles Chart on March 14, 2010. It climbed to number one on the chart the following week, becoming Gaga's fourth number-one single in Britain. It has sold 1.2million copies and gained 58million streams in the UK as of July 2022 and was certified double platinum by the British Phonographic Industry (BPI), making it Gaga's fifth best-selling song in the region. According to a 2015 list by the Official Charts Company, "Telephone" was the third best-selling vinyl single in the UK for the 2010s. In Ireland, the song debuted at number 26, and moved up to number two, before reaching the summit of the chart the following week. "Telephone" peaked at number two in Sweden and number three in Hungary.

In Australia and New Zealand, "Telephone" reached a peak of three, and it was certified triple platinum by the Australian Recording Industry Association (ARIA) for shipments of 210,000copies of the single. "Telephone" debuted at number fourteen on the Canadian Hot 100 and moved to a peak of three, making it Gaga's sixth consecutive top-three single there. The song has been certified triple platinum by the Canadian Recording Industry Association (CRIA) for sales of 240,000digital downloads. According to the International Federation of the Phonographic Industry, the song was 2010's fourth best-selling single, with digital sales of 7.4 million copies that year.

Music video

Background and development

New York magazine reported that the concept of the video involved Beyoncé as she bails Gaga out of jail. In published photos from the set, Gaga and Beyoncé were seen shooting in a car called the "Pussy Wagon", which Uma Thurman's character drove in Quentin Tarantino's 2003 film Kill Bill: Vol. 1. Other concepts of the video involve scenes at a diner, an appearance from singer Tyrese Gibson, and a prison shower scene. Gaga and Beyoncé wore "destroyed denim pieces", designed by Frank Fernández and Oscar Olima. In an interview with E! Online, Gaga explained the deeper meaning of the video.
There was this really amazing quality in 'Paparazzi', where it kind of had this pure pop music quality but at the same time it was a commentary on fame culture [...] I wanted to do the same thing with this video [...] There certainly is a Tarantino-inspired quality in the ['Telephone'] video [...] His direct involvement in the video came from him lending me the Pussy Wagon. We were having lunch one day in Los Angeles and I was telling him about my concept for the video and he loved it so much he said, "You gotta use the Pussy Wagon."

In a February 2010 interview with Ryan Seacrest on KIIS-FM, Gaga commented, "What I like about it is it's a real true pop event, and when I was younger, I was always excited when there was a big giant event happening in pop music and that's what I wanted this to be." Rock band Semi Precious Weapons confirmed to MTV News that they would have a cameo role in the music video. On February 15, Gaga posted three film stills from the music video. They depicted her in three settings: a kitchen where she wears a plastic chef's hat and a telephone hairdo; a diner with her dancers, where she is seen wearing an American flag patterned bikini and bandana; and a black-and-white photo of her in a hat made from multiple triangles and corded telephones. On , more stills of the video were posted online. After multiple delays, the video premiered on E!

Filming
Because of busy schedules of Gaga and Beyoncé, director Jonas Åkerlund and cinematographer Pär Ekberg had to finish filming in two days while coordinating multiple locations, dance numbers and many extras. They spent most of their preparation time scouting locations and discussing the script and shot lists. To ensure a natural look while properly showcasing the outfits, makeup, props and art details, Ekberg took a minimalistic approach to lighting that involved shooting without a big pre-light and adding a beauty light for the artists. Åkerlund utilized a mixture of hydrargyrum medium-arc iodide lamps (HMI) and fluorescent fixtures to light the prison interiors and the diner scenes that were filmed at The Four Aces Motel in Palmdale, California. He used a Briese beauty light for close-ups and singles.

Using three cameras that ran almost constantly, the cinematography team could capture about 150 setups per day. For the kitchen scene, which was shot in a prison storage room, Åkerlund wanted to evoke a "clinical feel" and create "a mix of a kitchen and
a laboratory". The majority of the video was filmed on Kodak Vision3 250D 5207, which Åkerlund considers one of his favorite film stocks. During post-production, the team wanted to keep the colors true to the original negative, with minor adjustments for contrast and grain.

Synopsis
The music video is over nine minutes long and begins where "Paparazzi" left off after Gaga was arrested for killing her abusive boyfriend by poisoning his drink. Inside a women's prison, Gaga is led to her cell by two prison guards, who strip her naked while other inmates mock her. One of the guards comments: "I told you she didn't have a dick", referring to the rumors that Gaga is intersex. The video's first three minutes show Gaga's activities in the prison. Wearing sunglasses made out of half-smoked cigarettes, she kisses an inmate in the exercise yard and secretly steals her cell phone. Gaga also watches catfights in the commissary, which includes a cameo from her younger sister, Natali Germanotta. Gaga then answers a call from Beyoncé, and begins to sing the song. She performs the first verse and chorus with other scantily clothed inmates, and messages Beyoncé on the cell phone thanking her for bailing her out. This is followed by a bridge featuring Gaga in a yellow caution tape outfit designed by Brian Lichtenberg. Other fashion pieces were designed by Thierry Mugler, Atsuko Kudo and Gaga's own creative team, Haus of Gaga; the video was outfitted by Nicola Formichetti.

Bailed out from prison, Gaga gets inside the "Pussy Wagon" with Beyoncé, nicknamed Honey Bee, a reference to the character Honey Bunny in Tarantino's film Pulp Fiction (1994). The two briefly talk and travel through the desert to stop at a diner. After exchanging a silent dialogue with Bobo (Gibson), her misogynist boyfriend, Beyoncé poisons his drink but fails to kill him. The video features an intermediate sequence called "Let's Make a Sandwich", where Gaga is seen wearing a folded-up telephone on her head and preparing a sandwich in a kitchen, while dancers cavort behind her. Gaga poisons the food she prepares for the unsuspecting customers, causing them to die, including Bobo, characters played by Semi Precious Weapons and Lava – her Great Dane. Strutting around their corpses, Gaga and Beyoncé dance in American flag-inspired garments and shredded denim. The two leave the diner in the "Pussy Wagon" and travel on a highway as a news reporter reports the murders at the diner. The final shots show the duo travelling through the desert while police sirens wail in the background. The video ends with the line "To Be Continued ..." followed by end credits. Åkerlund put this line as a joke to create a blend of a trailer, short film and movie scene that organically unfolds as it progresses.

Reception

Critics quickly hailed the video as "a masterpiece of subversive artistry". It was called "the most fun, most ridiculous, and arguably best music video of the year" by Amy Phillips from Pitchfork and a "big-budget, pop masterwork" by William Goodman of Spin. According to James Montgomery from MTV, "Telephone" helped Gaga's ascent to the upper echelons of pop stardom, alongside "the Madonnas and the Michael Jacksons". Tanner Stransky from Entertainment Weekly believed it was not on par with the video for Gaga's "Bad Romance"—the lead single from The Fame Monster—but still "better than anything else out there". The scenes with the fight between inmates and mass food-poisoning were particularly praised by Matt Donnelly from the Los Angeles Times and Monica Herrera from Billboard. For Donnelly, the video was a "visual feast", and Herrera believed it "more than measures up to the hype". Some reviews praised Beyoncé, called "always fierce" by Jennifer Cady of E! and the video's "best part" by Amy Odell from New York. Others focused on the video's fashion and aesthetics. According to stylist Robert Verdi, with "Telephone", Gaga made "much stronger pop-art statements". In a 2021 article, Variety named it Gaga's best music video based on its outfits, calling it a "phenomenal fashion feast".

Some reviews praised the video's feminism. In his book Gaga Feminism: Sex, Gender, and the End of Normal, J. Jack Halberstam argued that the music video portrays a powerful image of sisterhood that aligns with the intimate bonds seen in movies such as Thelma & Louise (1991) and Set It Off (1996). Interpreting this review, theater theorist Bess Rowen wrote that Gaga's portrayal of women in her work challenges the conventional images of women in society, making her work relevant to modern feminism. Caryn Ganz of Rolling Stone believed it "is certainly cinematic and oddly feminist, and gasps at a larger statement about consumer culture". Ganz called the video a "mash-up of lesbian prison porn, campy sexploitation flicks and insidery winks at the two divas' public personas", noting, "If Quentin Tarantino and Russ Meyer remade Thelma & Louise as an orgy of product placement with fiercely choreographed interludes, this would be the result". 

The video for "Telephone" earned Gaga the Guinness World Record for Most Product Placement in a Video. Talking with NME in 2011, Gaga said the display of these items was not meant to be product placements but references to Andy Warhol as part of a commentary on commercialism in the US regarding technology and information overload. Because of this misunderstanding, she decided to not showcase so many products in her future music videos. The same year, Gaga expressed dissatisfaction with the video in an interview with Time Out. Although Gaga believed she and Beyoncé worked well together, the incorporation of numerous ideas left her "brain throbbing", and she expressed a desire to have edited herself more. In a 2020 piece for The New York Times, Lindsay Zoladz found this self-criticism unfair as she believed the video to be "one of the wildest and most watchable pop artifacts of its era, a defining moment in the music video's migration from MTV to the unruly internet".

Some reviews were less enthusiastic. Labeling the video's narrative incoherent, Alyssa Rosenberg of The Atlantic disliked the use of women's prison, muscular female prison guards and situational lesbianism. The video was called "disgusting [...] poison for the minds of our kids" by talk radio host Sandy Rios, "cruel and ugly" by critic Armond White and mediocre by Douglas Haddow of The Guardian. White stated that it "epitomizes the insanity of the contemporary pop mainstream" and pays "homage to Tarantino's influence" in distorting "pop culture pleasure into nonsense". Despite his negative view of the video, Haddow believed it was a highly effective advertisement in that Gaga successfully curated visual references and pop culture motifs designed to appeal to a wide range of demographics. He suggested that "Telephone" is indicative of a new era in which "content, celebrity and advertising" are fused together to create a marketable "goo".

Analysis
José M. Yebra of University of Zaragoza and Aylin Zafar of The Atlantic recognized feminist themes in the video. Yebra wrote that Gaga is criminalized although she is a victim of domestic abuse. The all-female prison, named "prison for bitches", alludes to Gaga using the word "bitch" to mean female liberty. Gaga's metaphorical freedom in prison is solidified by scenes where she engages in lesbianism despite being in chains and her song "Paper Gangsta", a track about "girl power", plays. As such, Yebra found that the prison ironically becomes a place free from male abuse. Zafar interpreted the scene with Beyoncé and Gaga eating Honey Buns as a reversal of the objectification of women through food. She saw the scenes featuring Wonder Bread and Miracle Whip as a challenge to the gender stereotype of the "perfect housewife" portrayed heavily in 1950s pop culture. According to Yebra, this stereotype is subverted through Gaga, who embodies a drag queen and a murderer, along with her flamboyant dancers, in an unexpected setting—the kitchen of an American middle class family.

Katrin Horn, a postdoctoral fellow in American studies, analyzed the sexuality in the video. According to her, it was inspired by the "lesploitation" genre of B movies, known for their objectification of women's bodies and minimization of violence against women. The video subverts the genre by casting a muscular performance artist as the object of Gaga's desire, portraying female bodybuilders as prison guards and adding a "lesbian happy ending". It additionally portrays women—whom the "heteronormative culture" would normally reject—as attractive and places conventionally beautiful women in contexts that challenge their sexual allure. Horn further discussed how the video combines elements of the rape-revenge and road movie genres to create a new narrative that emphasizes female empowerment and solidarity.

Drawing parallels between "Paparazzi" and "Telephone", authors Lori Burns and Marc Lafrance argued that Gaga's videos are not merely promotional but integral parts of her artistic production. They believed "Paparazzi" and "Telephone" are linked thematically and together form a broader narrative. The authors viewed the dance sequences in the videos as key moments in which the common themes and central narrative problems become apparent. Burns and Lafrance wrote the music videos represent two different ideas, but understanding how these oppositions are constructed is essential for fully comprehending their themes and meaning. "Paparazzi" shows a glamorous lifestyle of affluence and success, whereas "Telephone" represents crime, violence, poverty and vulgarity. The videos' chromatic elements also contrast with each other—"Paparazzi" uses opulent and refined colors, and "Telephone" employs cartoon and pop art hues. The authors believed these differences link the themes of Gaga's larger artistic interest in celebrity culture and its relation to spectacle and surveillance.

In a comparison of the videos for "Telephone" and "Video Phone", author Robin James wrote that misogyny in rap is often used to "scapegoat black men", making them seem solely responsible for it although it is also common among white supremacists. James opined that to support post-racial and post-feminist ideologies, the modern media has updated this trope by having female characters eliminate such misogynist black men. She found "Telephone" reinforced this belief: Gaga and Beyoncé form a "cross-racial bond" through their need to defeat the stereotypically misogynistic black man, thus confirming that the white supremacist patriarchy is indeed "multi-racial" in nature.

Accolades
In the annual Pazz and Jop mass critics poll of the year's best in music, "Telephone" was ranked number 16 in 2010. It was placed at number three by Rob Sheffield of Rolling Stone on his Top 25 Singles of the 2010 list. Sheffield stated that "Telephone" was a "communication breakdown on the dance floor" and added, "Beyonce, the most egregiously non-crazy pop star of our time, gets to pretend she's as nuts as Gaga for a few minutes." Amy Phillips placed "Telephone" at number 55 in her list "Top Tracks of 2010", noting that it was "one of the less weird tracks" on The Fame Monster. The song was included on year-end lists of best songs compiled by MTV News and PopMatters at number ten and 29 respectively. The latter found it "the distilled essence of the Lady Gaga and the apex of her career to date". In 2011, Gary Trust of Billboard listed "Telephone" at the fourth position on his list of the 10 All-Female Hit Collaborations.

In 2010, "Telephone" was nominated in the category for Fave Song at the Australian Nickelodeon Kids' Choice Awards and Favorite Song at the 37th People's Choice Awards. The following year, the song was nominated for the Grammy Award for Best Pop Collaboration with Vocals. It was recognized as one of the Most Performed Songs at the 2011 ASCAP Pop Music Awards. The same year, BMI listed "Telephone" as one of the Award-Winning Songs at their awards ceremony. It was also nominated for Best Single and won Best Collaboration at the 2011 Virgin Media Music Awards.

At the 2010 MTV Video Music Awards, the music video for "Telephone" won Best Collaboration and was nominated for Best Choreography and Video of the Year, losing both to Gaga's own "Bad Romance" video. It was placed at number three on NMEs list of "50 Best Music Videos of 2010". On Spins list of "The 20 Best Music Videos of 2010", the video was put at number seven with the comment that "the decision to enlist the normally buttoned-up Beyoncé in Gaga's lezzie jailbird fantasia was genius". The writers of Pitchfork Media also put the video on their list of "The Top Music Videos of 2010". NME placed it at number 17 on their list of "100 Greatest Music Videos", concluding that it "eschews all the overreaching cosmic weirdness of her recent clips and settles for a nine-minute lesbo action-filled Tarantino rip-off". In January 2015, Billboard named the video as the best music video of the first half of the 2010s, writing that "Gaga had triumphed again, and that this decade was off to a spectacular start".

Live performances

Gaga and Beyoncé have never sung "Telephone" together on any live show, but both performed it individually. Beyoncé's only performance of "Telephone" was during the 2011 Glastonbury Festival, where she sang it in front of an audience of more than 175,000people. Gaga first sang "Telephone" with "Dance in the Dark", the fourth single from The Fame Monster, at the 2010 Brit Awards at Earls Court Exhibition Centre. Inspired by the recent death of her friend, fashion designer Alexander McQueen, she changed the concept of her performance at the last minute to pay tribute to him. Gaga said, "I wanted to do a very, very forward performance, something that I felt was a true representation of the future." Before the show, she posted a message on her Twitter account: "Tonight's performance is inspired by our friend. Mask by Phillip Treacy, Sculpture by Nick Knight, Music by Lady Gaga. We miss you." She started the performance by announcing "This is for Alexander McQueen." Gaga was dressed in a complete white outfit with a huge Marie Antoinette-style wig. The performance was described as more restrained compared to her previous ones by The Wall Street Journal. In 2015, Liv Moss of Official Charts Company called it one of the "biggest, best and weirdest" performances in the history of Brit Awards. The following year, Daniel Welsh of HuffPost UK cited it as one of Gaga's 15 most memorable performances on television.

Gaga added "Telephone" to The Monster Ball Tour's setlist, for the 2010–2011 leg. She was dressed in black underwear and imitated a phone call with Beyoncé at the beginning of the performance, yelling "Beyoncé? You shady bitch!" to her cell phone. She then started singing the track while doing its choreography on an extended catwalk from the main stage. Gaga performed "Telephone" and "Brown Eyes" (from The Fame) on the British comedy chat show Friday Night with Jonathan Ross, on March 3, 2010, for an episode that aired two days later. She sang "Telephone" on the Japanese television show Music Station on April 16, 2010, where she also played on a keytar. In May 2011, Gaga performed the song during Radio 1's Big Weekend in Carlisle, Cumbria. She sang it on her concert tours the Born This Way Ball (2012–2013) and the ArtRave: The Artpop Ball tour (2014); during the latter it was part of a medley with "Poker Face".

In 2017, Gaga performed "Telephone" as part of her biggest hits during the Super Bowl LI halftime show. She started the song while holding a crystal scepter in her hand. Later that year, she sang it during both her shows at Coachella, where she was pushed around the stage by her dancers in a glass phone booth. "Telephone" was later added to the setlist to her concert tours, the Joanne World Tour (2017–2018) and The Chromatica Ball (2022), as well as her Las Vegas residency show, Enigma (2018–2020). Reviewing The Chromatica Ball, Gigwise Laviea Thomas wrote that it "stood out as one of the best performances of the evening. With fire catapulting into the sky, frantic stage lights, and a shed load of energy radiating off Gaga and her dancers."

Other versions
On May 2, 2010, a demo of "Telephone" featuring vocals by Britney Spears leaked onto the web. After suggestions that the demo may be fake, the producer of the song, Rodney Jerkins, confirmed the authenticity of the song, via Twitter. Adding that the leaked version was an early, unmixed demo recording, he denied leaking it despite demands. The demo's musical style was compared with Spears's 2007 single "Piece of Me", and the song itself generated comparisons with Spears' sound in her fifth studio album Blackout. Rob Sheffield of Rolling Stone praised Spears's version including it at number twenty-five on his Top 25 Singles of the 2010 list.

Children's music group Kidz Bop covered the song but changed its line "I'm sippin that bubb" to "I'm eating that grub" to make it family-friendly. Girl group Little Mix blended "Telephone" with Queen's "Radio Ga Ga" (1984) during the eighth series of the British The X Factor and later released this version as a single. Released as a single, it reached number 22 in Ireland and 30 in Australia. In 2019, the cast of the reality show Queer Eye performed a lip sync of the song to a positive response from Xavier Piedra of Billboard.

Track listing and formats

 UK CD Single
 "Telephone" (feat. Beyoncé) – 3:40
 "Telephone" (Alphabeat Radio Edit) [feat. Beyoncé] – 4:51

 UK iTunes digital single
 "Telephone" (feat. Beyoncé) – 3:40
 "Telephone" (feat. Beyoncé) [Music Video] – 9:27

 European/Brazilian/New Zealand digital downloads
 "Telephone" (Crookers Vocal Club Remix) [feat. Beyoncé] – 4:49
 "Telephone" (Electrolightz Remix) [feat. Beyoncé] – 4:26
 "Telephone" (Kaskade Club Remix) [feat. Beyoncé] – 5:24
 "Telephone" (Ming Club Remix) [feat. Beyoncé] – 4:31
 "Telephone" (Tom Neville's Ear Ringer Radio Edit) [feat. Beyoncé] – 4:17
 UK Alphabeat Extended Remix digital download
 "Telephone" (Alphabeat Extended Remix) [feat. Beyoncé] – 6:41
 UK DJ Dan Extended Vocal Remix digital download
 "Telephone" (DJ Dan Extended Vocal Remix) [feat. Beyoncé] – 5:59
 French Passion Pit Remix digital download
 "Telephone" (Passion Pit Remix) [feat. Beyoncé] – 5:12
 UK 7" inch vinyl
 "Telephone" (feat. Beyoncé) – 3:40
 "Telephone" (Passion Pit Remix) [feat. Beyoncé] – 5:13

 International remix EP
 "Telephone" (Alphabeat Club Remix) [feat. Beyoncé] – 6:41
 "Telephone" (Crookers Vocal Club Remix) [feat. Beyoncé] – 4:50
 "Telephone" (DJ Dan Vocal Club Remix) [feat. Beyoncé] – 5:59
 "Telephone" (DJ Dan Vocal Radio Edit) [feat. Beyoncé] – 3:28
 Only included on the digital release
 "Telephone" (Doctor Rosen Rosen Club Remix) [feat. Beyoncé] – 6:25
 "Telephone" (Electrolightz Remix) [feat. Beyoncé] – 4:26
 "Telephone" (Kaskade Club Remix) [feat. Beyoncé] – 5:24
 "Telephone" (Ming Club Remix) [feat. Beyoncé] – 4:31
 "Telephone" (Passion Pit Remix) [feat. Beyoncé] – 5:13
 "Telephone" (Tom Neville's Ear Ringer Club Remix) [feat. Beyoncé] – 7:14

 "The DJ Remixes" digital EP
 "Telephone" (Alphabeat Radio Edit) [feat. Beyoncé] – 4:49
 "Telephone" (Crookers Dub) [feat. Beyoncé] – 5:08
 "Telephone" (DJ Dan Dub) [feat. Beyoncé] – 6:22
 "Telephone" (Kaskade Dub) [feat. Beyoncé] – 4:40
 "Telephone" (Kaskade Radio Edit) [feat. Beyoncé] – 3:43
 "Telephone" (Ming Dub) [feat. Beyoncé] – 4:03
 "Telephone" (Ming Radio Edit) [feat. Beyoncé] – 3:12
 "Telephone" (Tom Neville's Ear Ringer Radio Edit) [feat. Beyoncé] – 4:18
 "Bad Romance" (DJ Paulo's GaGa Oo-La La Remix) – 9:41

Credits and personnel
Credits adapted from the liner notes of The Fame Monster.

Recording and management
 Gaga's vocals recorded at Darkchild Studios (Los Angeles, California)
 Knowles' vocals recorded at Studio Groove (Osaka, Japan)
 Mixed at Chalice Studios (Los Angeles, California)
 Mastered at Oasis Mastering (Burbank, California), AfterMaster Recording and Mastering Studios (Hollywood, California)
 Knowles appears courtesy of Music World Entertainment and Columbia Records
 Published by Stefani Germanotta P/K/A Lady Gaga (BMI), Sony/ATV Songs LLC, House Of Gaga Publishing Inc., Glojoe Music Inc. (BMI) Rodney Jerkins/EMI Blackwood Music Publishing (BMI), EMI April Music (ASCAP), EMI Blackwood/RJ Productions LLC, B-Day Publishing and EMI April Music, Inc. (ASCAP)

Personnel

 Lady Gaga – lead vocals, songwriter, producer
 Beyoncé – featured vocals, songwriter
 Rodney "Darkchild" Jerkins – songwriter, producer, mixing
 LaShawn Daniels – songwriter
 Lazonate Franklin – songwriter
 Paul Foley – recording
 Mike "Handz" Donaldson – recording (Gaga's vocals), special effects, additional vocal production
 Hisashi Mizoguchi – recording (Beyoncé's vocals)
 Mark "Spike" Stent – mixing
 Gene Grimaldi – mastering
 Larry Ryckman and Ari Blitz – mastering
 Takayuki Matsushima – Beyoncé's vocals recording assistant
 Matty Green – mixing assistant

Charts

Weekly charts

Monthly charts

Year-end charts

Certifications and sales

Release history

See also

 List of European number-one hits of 2010
 List of Billboard Hot 100 top-ten singles in 2010
 List of number-one dance singles of 2010 (U.S.)
 List of number-one hits of 2010 (Denmark)
 List of number-one songs in Norway
 List of number-one singles from the 2010s (UK)
 Number-one singles of 2010 (Ireland)
 List of Mainstream Top 40 number-one hits of 2010 (U.S.)
 Ultratop 40 number-one hits of 2010
 Ultratop 50 number-one hits of 2010

Footnotes

References

Cited sources

 
 
 
 
 
 
 
 
 
 
 
 

2009 songs
2010 singles
Beyoncé songs
Dance-pop songs
European Hot 100 Singles number-one singles
Female vocal duets
Interscope Records singles
Irish Singles Chart number-one singles
Lady Gaga songs
Music video controversies
Music videos directed by Jonas Åkerlund
Number-one singles in Denmark
Number-one singles in Greece
Number-one singles in Hungary
Number-one singles in Israel
Number-one singles in Norway
Number-one singles in Scotland
Song recordings produced by Lady Gaga
Song recordings produced by Rodney Jerkins
Songs about telephone calls
Songs about telephones
Songs about nightclubs
Songs written by Beyoncé
Songs written by Lady Gaga
Songs written by LaShawn Daniels
Songs written by Rodney Jerkins
UK Singles Chart number-one singles
Ultratop 50 Singles (Flanders) number-one singles
Ultratop 50 Singles (Wallonia) number-one singles